Røgeberg is a Norwegian surname. Notable people with the surname include:

Olav Røgeberg (1885–1959), Norwegian journalist, newspaper editor, and magazine editor
Willy Røgeberg (1905–1969), Norwegian rifle shooter 

Norwegian-language surnames